The 2020 United States House of Representatives elections in Ohio was held on November 3, 2020, to elect the 16 U.S. representatives from the state of Ohio, one from each of the state's 16 congressional districts. The elections coincided with the 2020 U.S. presidential election, as well as other elections to the House of Representatives, elections to the United States Senate and various state and local elections. Primaries were held on April 28, 2020.

Results summary

Statewide

District
Results of the 2020 United States House of Representatives elections in Ohio by district:

District 1

The 1st district is based in Cincinnati, stretching southwestward to Ohio's borders with Kentucky and Indiana. The incumbent is Republican Steve Chabot, who was re-elected with 51.3% of the vote in 2018.

Republican primary

Candidates

Nominee
Steve Chabot, incumbent U.S. Representative

Declined
Rocky Boiman, ESPN football analyst and former Green Township trustee
Amy Murray, Cincinnati city councilwoman

Endorsements

Primary results

Democratic primary

Candidates

Nominee
Kate Schroder, health care executive

Eliminated in primary
Nikki Foster, businesswoman and U.S. Air Force veteran

Declined
Brigid Kelly, state representative (endorsed Schroder)
Denise Driehaus, president of the Hamilton County Board of Commissioners and former state representative
Aftab Pureval, attorney, Hamilton County Clerk of Courts and nominee for this seat in 2018
Alicia Reece, former state representative
Jill Schiller, former special assistant in the White House Office of Management and Budget and nominee for the 2nd District in 2018

Endorsements

Primary results

Third parties

Libertarian Party

Candidates
Kevin David Kahn (Libertarian)

Results

General election

Endorsements

Polling

Predictions

Results

District 2

The 2nd district takes eastern Cincinnati and its suburbs, including Norwood and Loveland, and stretches eastward along the Ohio River. The incumbent is Republican Brad Wenstrup, who was re-elected with 57.6% of the vote in 2018.

Republican primary

Candidates

Nominee
Brad Wenstrup, incumbent U.S. Representative

Eliminated in primary
H. Robert Harris

Primary results

Democratic primary

Candidates

Nominee
Jaime Castle, teacher

Primary results

General election

Predictions

Endorsements

Results

District 3

The 3rd district, located entirely within the borders of Franklin County, taking in inner Columbus, Bexley, Whitehall, as well as Franklin County's share of Reynoldsburg. The incumbent is Democrat Joyce Beatty, who was re-elected with 73.6% of the vote in 2018.

Democratic primary

Candidates

Nominee
Joyce Beatty, incumbent U.S. Representative

Eliminated in primary
Morgan Harper, former special adviser to the director of the Consumer Financial Protection Bureau

Endorsements

Primary results

Republican primary

Candidates

Nominee
Mark Richardson, U.S. Navy veteran

Eliminated in primary
Cleophus Dulaney, businessman

Primary results

General election

Endorsements

Predictions

Results

District 4

The 4th district, nicknamed the "duck district", sprawls from the Columbus exurbs, including Marion and Lima into north-central Ohio, taking in Oberlin. The incumbent is Republican Jim Jordan, who was re-elected with 65.3% of the vote in 2018.

Republican primary

Candidates

Nominee
Jim Jordan, incumbent U.S. Representative

Endorsements

Primary results

Democratic primary

Candidates

Nominee
 Shannon Freshour, litigation paralegal

Eliminated in primary
 Mike Larsen, television program scriptwriter and former Congressional staffer
 Jeffrey Sites, Army veteran and assistant manager of shipping and receiving for a company in Findlay

Endorsements

Primary results

Third parties

Libertarian Party

Candidates
 Steve Perkins

Results

Independents

Candidates
 Chris Gibbs (Independent), grain farmer and former chair of the Shelby County Republican Party

General Election

Predictions

Results

District 5

The 5th district encompasses Northwestern Ohio, taking in Findlay, Defiance, and Bowling Green. The incumbent is Republican Bob Latta, who was re-elected with 62.3% of the vote in 2018.

Republican primary

Candidates

Nominee
Bob Latta, incumbent U.S. Representative

Primary results

Democratic primary

Candidates

Nominee
Nick Rubando, cultural programmer

Eliminated in primary
M. Xavier Carrigan, truck driver
Gene Redinger

Endorsements

Primary results

General election

Predictions

Results

District 6

The 6th district encompasses Appalachian Ohio, including Steubenville, Marietta, and Ironton. The incumbent is Republican Bill Johnson, who was re-elected with 69.2% of the vote in 2018.

Republican primary

Candidates

Nominee
Bill Johnson, incumbent U.S. Representative

Eliminated in primary
Kenneth Morgan

Primary results

Democratic primary

Candidates

Nominee
Shawna Roberts, former small business owner and nominee for this seat in 2018

Primary results

General election

Predictions

Results

District 7

The 7th district is based in northeastern Ohio, and includes the city of Canton. The incumbent is Republican Bob Gibbs, who was re-elected with 58.7% of the vote in 2018.

Republican primary

Candidates

Nominee
Bob Gibbs, incumbent U.S. Representative

Primary results

Democratic primary

Candidates

Nominee
 Quentin Potter (write-in)

Disqualified
Patrick Pikus, business manager and candidate for Ohio's 7th congressional district in 2018

Results

Third parties

Libertarian Party

Candidates
Brandon Lape (Libertarian), computer technician

Results

General election

Predictions

Results

District 8

The 8th district takes in the northern suburbs of Cincinnati, including Butler County, as well as taking in Springfield. The incumbent is Republican Warren Davidson, who was re-elected with 66.6% of the vote in 2018.

Republican primary

Candidates

Nominee
Warren Davidson, incumbent U.S. Representative

Eliminated in primary
Edward Meer, Founder of Blue Butler

Primary results

Democratic primary

Candidates

Nominee
Vanessa Enoch, management consultant and nominee for this seat in 2018

Eliminated in primary
Matthew Guyette, paralegal and candidate for this seat in 2014 and 2018

Primary results

General election

Endorsements

Predictions

Results

District 9

The 9th district spans the coast of Lake Erie from Toledo to the west side of Cleveland, taking in Port Clinton, Sandusky, Lorain, Lakewood, Brook Park, and Brooklyn. The incumbent is Democrat Marcy Kaptur, who was re-elected with 67.8% of the vote in 2018.

Democratic primary

Candidates

Nominee
Marcy Kaptur, incumbent U.S. Representative

Eliminated in primary
Peter Rosewicz, loan officer

Primary results

Republican primary

Candidates

Nominee
Rob Weber

Eliminated in primary
Charles Barrett
Tim Connors
Timothy Corrigan

Primary results

General election

Endorsements

Predictions

Results

District 10

The 10th district encompasses the Dayton metro area, including Dayton and the surrounding suburbs. The incumbent is Republican Mike Turner, who was re-elected with 55.9% of the vote in 2018.

Republican primary

Candidates

Nominee
Mike Turner, incumbent U.S. Representative

Eliminated in primary
John Anderson
Kathi Flanders, nurse practitioner

Primary results

Democratic primary

Candidates

Declared
Desiree Tims, attorney and former political aide to U.S. Senators Sherrod Brown and Kirsten Gillibrand

Eliminated in primary
Eric Moyer, former NASA research scientist and Alzheimer's researcher

Endorsements

Primary results

General election

Endorsements

Polling

Predictions

Results

District 11

The 11th district takes in eastern Cleveland and its suburbs, including Euclid, Cleveland Heights, and Warrensville Heights, as well as stretching southward into Richfield and parts of Akron. The incumbent is Democrat Marcia Fudge, who was re-elected with 82.2% of the vote in 2018.

Democratic primary

Candidates

Nominee
Marcia Fudge, incumbent U.S. Representative

Eliminated in primary
James Jerome Bell, write-in candidate for this seat in 2018
Michael Hood, U.S. Navy veteran
Tariq Shabazz, graduate student

Primary results

Republican primary

Candidates

Nominee
Laverne Gore, community activist

Eliminated in primary
Jonah Schulz, non-profit owner
Shalira Taylor, marketing consultant and activist

Primary results

General election

Endorsements

Predictions

Results

District 12

The 12th district encompasses the northern Columbus metro area, taking in the northern Columbus suburbs, including Dublin, Westerville, Gahanna, and New Albany, as well as, Newark, Mansfield, and Zanesville. The incumbent is Republican Troy Balderson, who was re-elected with 51.4% of the vote in 2018.

Republican primary

Candidates

Nominee
Troy Balderson, incumbent U.S. Representative

Eliminated in primary
Tim Day, Ohio National Guard veteran

Primary results

Democratic primary

Candidates

Nominee
Alaina Shearer, businesswoman

Eliminated in primary
Jenny Bell, nurse practitioner

Declined
Danny O'Connor, Franklin County recorder and nominee for this seat in 2018

Endorsements

Primary results

General election

Endorsements

Polling

Predictions

Results

District 13

The 13th district covers the Mahoning Valley in northeastern Ohio, including Youngstown and eastern parts of Akron. The incumbent is Democrat Tim Ryan, who was re-elected with 61.0% of the vote in 2018, and ran for president in 2020, though he dropped out on October 24, 2019. He is seeking re-election.

Democratic primary

Candidates

Nominee
Tim Ryan, incumbent U.S. Representative

Primary results

Republican primary

Candidates

Nominee
Christina Hagan, former state representative and candidate for 16th district in 2018

Eliminated in primary
Duane Hennen, businessman and former pastor
Lou Lyras, businessman
Richard Morckel
Jason Mormando
Robert Santos
Donald Truex

Declined
Mary Taylor, former Lieutenant Governor of Ohio

Primary results

Third parties

Libertarian Party

Candidates
Michael Fricke

Primary results

General election

Endorsements

Predictions

Results

District 14

The 14th district is located in Northeast Ohio, taking in the eastern suburbs and exurbs of Cleveland, including Mayfield Heights, Solon, and Independence, as well as Ashtabula, Lake, and Geauga counties, northern Portage County, and northeastern Summit County. The incumbent is Republican David Joyce, who was re-elected with 55.2% of the vote in 2018.

Republican primary

Candidates

Nominee
David Joyce, incumbent U.S. Representative

Eliminated in primary
Mark Pitrone, write-in candidate for this seat in 2018

Primary results

Democratic primary

Candidates

Nominee
Hillary O'Connor Mueri, attorney and U.S. Navy veteran

Primary results

General election

Endorsements

Predictions

Results

District 15

The 15th district encompasses the southern Columbus metro area, taking in the western and eastern suburbs of Columbus, including Upper Arlington, Hilliard, and Grove City, as well as Athens. The incumbent is Republican Steve Stivers, who was re-elected with 58.3% of the vote in 2018.

Republican primary

Candidates

Nominee
Steve Stivers, incumbent U.S. Representative

Eliminated in primary
Shelby Hunt

Primary results

Democratic primary

Candidates

Nominee
Joel Newby, attorney

Eliminated in primary
Daniel Kilgore

Primary results

Third parties
Candidates

Declared 
Shane Hoffman (Write-In) American Solidarity Party

General election

Endorsements

Predictions

Results

District 16

The 16th district takes in the western suburbs of Cleveland, including Westlake, Parma, and Strongsville, as well Medina, Norton, and North Canton. The incumbent is Republican Anthony Gonzalez, who was first elected with 56.7% of the vote in 2018.

Republican primary

Candidates

Nominee
Anthony Gonzalez, incumbent U.S. Representative

Primary results

Democratic primary

Candidates

Nominee
Aaron Paul Godfrey, physicist and candidate for this seat in 2018

Eliminated in primary
Ronald Karpus III

Primary results

General election

Predictions

Results

See also
 2020 Ohio elections

Notes

Partisan clients

References

Further reading

External links
Elections & Voting  at the Ohio Secretary of State official website

 
 
  (State affiliate of the U.S. League of Women Voters)
 

Official campaign websites for 1st district candidates
 Steve Chabot (R) for Congress
 Kevin David Kahn (L) for Congress
 Kate Schroder (D) for Congress

Official campaign websites for 2nd district candidates
 Jaime Castle (D) for Congress
 Brad Wenstrup (R) for Congress

Official campaign websites for 3rd district candidates
 Joyce Beatty (D) for Congress
 Mark Richardson (R) for Congress

Official campaign websites for 4th district candidates
 Shannon Freshour (D) for Congress
 Chris Gibbs (I) for Congress
 Jim Jordan (R) for Congress

Official campaign websites for 5th district candidates
 Bob Latta (R) for Congress
 Nick Rubando (D) for Congress

Official campaign websites for 6th district candidates
 Bill Johnson (R) for Congress
 Shawna Roberts (D) for Congress

Official campaign websites for 7th district candidates
 Bob Gibbs (R) for Congress
 Brandon Lape (L) for Congress
 Quentin Potter (D) for Congress

Official campaign websites for 8th district candidates
 Warren Davidson (R) for Congress
 Vanessa Enoch (D) for Congress

Official campaign websites for 9th district candidates
 Marcy Kaptur (D) for Congress
 Rob Weber (R) for Congress

Official campaign websites for 10th district candidates
 Desiree Tims (D) for Congress
 Mike Turner (R) for Congress

Official campaign websites for 11th district candidates
 Marcia Fudge (D) for Congress
 Laverne Gore (R) for Congress

Official campaign websites for 12th district candidates
 Troy Balderson (R) for Congress
 Alaina Shearer (D) for Congress

Official campaign websites for 13th district candidates
 Christina Hagan (R) for Congress 
 Tim Ryan (D) for Congress 

Official campaign websites for 14th district candidates
 David Joyce (R) for Congress
 Hillary O'Connor Mueri (D) for Congress

Official campaign websites for 15th district candidates
 Joel Newby (D) for Congress
 Steve Stivers (R) for Congress

Official campaign websites for 16th district candidates
 Aaron Paul Godfrey (D) for Congress
 Anthony Gonzalez (R) for Congress

2020
Ohio
United States House of Representatives